The 7th Infantry Division is a formation of the Bangladesh Army. It's located in Lebukhali of Patuakhali District. This is the first Bangladesh Army formation in the Barisal Division. It was formed as part of the development vision of Bangladesh Armed Forces Forces Goal 2030. This project will have an estimated cost of Tk. 16.99 billion and will be implemented by Ministry of Defence.

Construction 
Barisal Division had no army installment and had to rely on 55 Infantry Divisions. To ensure security and the capability of Army in the country's southern area the decision was made to set up a new infantry division and cantonment in Lebukhali in 2016 as part of the Forces Goal 2030.

The Executive Committee of the National Economic Council (ECNEC), on 14 November 2017, approved the project. On 8 February 2018 Prime Minister Sheikh Hasina inaugurated Sheikh Hasina Cantonment and hoisted the flag of the 7th Infantry Division headquarters.

Formation 
A total of 15,512 posts and 33 army organisations will be created in 11 phases under the new infantry division. Current General Officer Commanding of the division is Major General Abdul Qayoom Mollah, ndc, psc. Currently there are only 11 unit in this division.

References 

Infantry divisions of Bangladesh
Military units and formations established in 2018
2018 establishments in Bangladesh